This is a list of members of the South Australian House of Assembly from 1910 to 1912, as elected at the 1910 state election:

 The three anti-Labor parties, the Liberal and Democratic Union, the Australasian National League and the Farmers and Producers Political Union, formally merged to form the Liberal Union in late 1910. They had been in merger discussions for some time, and had jointly endorsed a united Liberal ticket for all but three House of Assembly seats at the 1910 election.
 Barossa MHA Ephraim Coombe, who had been elected for the Liberal and Democratic Union, refused to sign the merged Liberal Union pledge and never sat with the new party. He served out his term as an independent, although some sources refer to him as unsuccessfully having tried to found a rival liberal party during this term.
 The Northern Territory was separated from South Australia and transferred to the Commonwealth on 1 January 1911. The two members for the Northern Territory ceased to be members of the House of Assembly as of 5 January.
 Wooroora MHA Sir Jenkin Coles had his seat vacated for absence without leave on 17 November 1911. No by-election was held before the 1912 election.

References

Members of South Australian parliaments by term
20th-century Australian politicians